In mathematics, a univariate polynomial of degree  with real or complex coefficients has  complex roots, if counted with their multiplicities. They form a multiset of  points in the complex plane. This article concerns the geometry of these points, that is the information about their localization in the complex plane that can be deduced from the degree and the coefficients of the polynomial.

Some of these geometrical properties are related to a single polynomial, such as upper bounds on the absolute values of the roots, which define a disk containing all roots, or lower bounds on the distance between two roots. Such bounds are widely used for root-finding algorithms for polynomials, either for tuning them, or for computing their computational complexity.

In this article, a polynomial that is considered is always denoted 

Continuous dependence on coefficients
The  roots of a polynomial of degree  depend continuously on the coefficients. For simple roots, this results immediately from the implicit function theorem. This is true also for multiple roots, but some care is needed for the proof.

A small change of coefficients may induce a dramatic change of the roots, including the change of a real root into a complex root with a rather large imaginary part (see Wilkinson's polynomial). A consequence is that, for classical numeric root-finding algorithms, the problem of approximating the roots given the coefficients is ill-conditioned for many inputs.

Conjugation

The complex conjugate root theorem states that if the coefficients
of a polynomial are real, then the non-real roots appear in pairs of the form  .

It follows that the roots of a polynomial with real coefficients are mirror-symmetric with respect to the real axis.

This can be extended to algebraic conjugation: the roots of a polynomial with rational coefficients are conjugate (that is, invariant) under the action of the Galois group of the polynomial. However, this symmetry can rarely be interpreted geometrically.

Bounds on all roots
Upper bounds on the absolute values of polynomial roots are widely used for root-finding algorithms, either for limiting the regions where roots should be searched, or for the computation of the computational complexity of these algorithms. 

Many such bounds have been given, and the sharper one depends generally on the specific sequence of coefficient that are considered. Most bounds are greater or equal to one, and are thus not sharp for a polynomial which have only roots of absolute values lower than one. However, such polynomials are very rare, as shown below.

Any upper bound on the absolute values of roots provides a corresponding lower bound.

then  is a lower bound of the absolute values of the roots of

since the roots of either polynomial are the multiplicative inverses of the roots of the other. Therefore, in the remainder of the article lower bounds will not be given explicitly.

Lagrange's and Cauchy's bounds
Lagrange and Cauchy were the first to provide upper bounds on all complex roots. Lagrange's bound is
 
and Cauchy's bound is
 

Lagrange's bound is sharper (smaller) than Cauchy's bound only when 1 is larger than the sum of all  but the largest. This is relatively rare in practice, and explains why Cauchy's bound is more widely used than Lagrange's.

Both bounds result from the Gershgorin circle theorem applied to the companion matrix of the polynomial and its transpose. They can also be proved by elementary methods.

If  is a root of the polynomial, and  one has 

Dividing by  one gets 

which is Lagrange's bound when there is at least one root of absolute value larger than 1. Otherwise, 1 is a bound on the roots, and is not larger than Lagrange's bound.

Similarly, for Cauchy's bound, one has, if ,

Thus 

Otherwise the bound is also correct, as Cauchy's bound is larger than 1.

These bounds are not invariant by scaling. Thus, one may get sharper bounds by minimizing over possible scalings. This gives 
 
and
 
for Lagrange's and Cauchy's bounds respectively.

Another bound, originally given by Lagrange, but attributed to Zassenhaus by Donald Knuth, is  
 
This bound is invariant by scaling.

Thus one has

for 

and thus, after dividing by 

As we want to prove , we may suppose that  (otherwise there is nothing to prove).
Thus 

which gives the result, since 

Lagrange improved this latter bound into the sum of the two largest values (possibly equal) in the sequence
 

Lagrange also provided the bound 
 
where  denotes the th nonzero coefficient when the terms of the polynomials are sorted by increasing degrees.

Using Hölder's inequality
Hölder's inequality allows the extension of Lagrange's and Cauchy's bounds to every -norm. The -norm of a sequence

is 

for any real number , and 

 

For , one has the bound
 
This is not only a bound of the absolute values of the roots, but also a bound of the product of their absolute values larger than 1; see , below.

Let  be a root of the polynomial

Setting 

we have to prove that every root  of  satisfies

If  the inequality is true; so, one may suppose  for the remainder of the proof.

Writing the equation as

Hölder's inequality implies

If , this is

Thus

In the case , the summation formula for a geometric progression, gives

Thus

which simplifies to

Thus, in all cases

which finishes the proof.

Other bounds
Many other upper bounds for the magnitudes of all roots have been given.

Fujiwara's bound
  
slightly improves the bound given above by dividing the last argument of the maximum by two.

Kojima's bound is
 
where  denotes the th nonzero coefficient when the terms of the polynomials are sorted by increasing degrees. If all coefficients are nonzero, Fujiwara's bound is sharper, since each element in Fujiwara's bound is the geometric mean of first elements in Kojima's bound.

Sun and Hsieh obtained another improvement on Cauchy's bound. Assume the polynomial is monic with general term . Sun and Hsieh showed that upper bounds  and  could be obtained from the following equations.

 is the positive root of the cubic equation

They also noted that .

Landau's inequality
The previous bounds are upper bounds for each root separately. Landau's inequality provides an upper bound for the absolute values of the product of the roots that have an absolute value greater than one. This inequality, discovered in 1905 by Edmund Landau, has been forgotten and rediscovered at least three times during the 20th century.

This bound of the product of roots is not much greater than the best preceding bounds of each root separately.
Let  be the  roots of the polynomial . If

then 

Surprisingly, this bound of the product of the absolute values larger than 1 of the roots is not much larger than the best bounds of one root that have been given above for a single root. This bound is even exactly equal to one of the bounds that are obtained using Hölder's inequality.

This bound is also useful to bound the coefficients of a divisor of a polynomial with integer coefficients: if

and, by Vieta's formulas,

Thus 

and

Discs containing some roots

From Rouché theorem

Rouché's theorem allows defining discs centered at zero and containing a given number of roots. More precisely, if there is a positive real number  and an integer  such that

If  then

The above result may be applied if the polynomial

In the remaining of the section, suppose that . If it is not the case, zero is a root, and the localization of the other roots may be studied by dividing the polynomial by a power of the indeterminate, getting a polynomial with a nonzero constant term.

They are thus sharper than all bounds given in the preceding sections.

So, the above result may be applied only in the first case. If  are these two roots, the above result implies that
 
 
for the  other roots.

Instead of explicitly computing  and  it is generally sufficient to compute a value  such that  (necessarily ).

For computing  one can use the fact that  is a convex function (its second derivative is positive). Thus  exists if and only if  is negative at its unique minimum.

One can increase the number of existing 's by applying the root squaring operation of the Dandelin–Graeffe iteration.

From Gershgorin circle theorem 
The Gershgorin circle theorem applies the companion matrix of the polynomial on a basis related to Lagrange interpolation to define discs centered at the interpolation points, each containing a root of the polynomial; see  for details.

If the interpolation points are close to the roots of the roots of the polynomial, the radii of the discs are small, and this is a key ingredient of Durand–Kerner method for computing polynomial roots.

Bounds of real roots

For polynomials with real coefficients, it is often useful to bound only the real roots.

Clearly, every bound of all roots applies also for real roots. But in some contexts, tighter bounds of real roots are useful. For example, the efficiency of the method of continued fractions for real-root isolation strongly depends on tightness of a bound of positive roots. This has led to establishing new bounds that are tighter than the general bounds of all roots. These bounds are generally expressed not only in terms of the absolute values of the coefficients, but also in terms of their signs.

Other bounds apply only to polynomials whose all roots are reals (see below).

Bounds of positive real roots

To give a bound of the positive roots, one can assume  without loss of generality, as changing the signs of all coefficients does not change the roots.

Every upper bound of the positive roots of 

is also a bound of the real zeros of 
. 
In fact, if  is such a bound, for all , one has .

Applied to Cauchy's bound, this gives the upper bound 

for the real roots of a polynomial with real coefficients.

Similarly, another upper bound of the positive roots is 

If all nonzero coefficients have the same sign, there is no positive root, and the maximum must be zero.

Other bounds have been recently developed, mainly for the method of continued fractions for real-root isolation.

Polynomials whose roots are all real

If all roots of a polynomial are real, Laguerre proved the following lower and upper bounds of the roots, by using what is now called Samuelson's inequality.

Let  be a polynomial with all real roots. Then its roots are located in the interval with endpoints

For example, the roots of the polynomial  satisfy

Root separation

The root separation of a polynomial is the minimal distance between two roots, that is the minimum of the absolute values of the difference of two roots:

The root separation is a fundamental parameter of the computational complexity of root-finding algorithms for polynomials. In fact, the root separation determines the precision of number representation that is needed for being certain of distinguishing distinct roots. Also, for real-root isolation, it allows bounding the number of interval divisions that are needed for isolating all roots.

For polynomials with real or complex coefficients, it is not possible to express a lower bound of the root separation in terms of the degree and the absolute values of the coefficients only, because a small change on a single coefficient transforms a polynomial with multiple roots into a square-free polynomial with a small root separation, and essentially the same absolute values of the coefficient. However, involving the discriminant of the polynomial allows a lower bound.

This allows lower bounds for root separation that are independent from the discriminant.

Mignotte's separation bound is

where  is the discriminant, and  

For a square free polynomial with integer coefficients, this implies 

Gauss–Lucas theorem

The Gauss–Lucas theorem states that the convex hull of the roots of a polynomial contains the roots of the derivative of the polynomial.

A sometimes useful corollary is that, if all roots of a polynomial have positive real part, then so do the roots of all derivatives of the polynomial.

A related result is Bernstein's inequality. It states that for a polynomial P of degree n with derivative P′ we have

Statistical distribution of the roots

If the coefficients  of a random polynomial are independently and identically distributed with a mean of zero, most complex roots are on the unit circle or close to it. In particular, the real roots are mostly located near , and, moreover, their expected number is, for a large degree, less than the natural logarithm of the degree.

If the coefficients are Gaussian distributed with a mean of zero and variance of σ then the mean density of real roots is given by the Kac formula

 

where

 

When the coefficients are Gaussian distributed with a non-zero mean and variance of σ, a similar but more complex formula is known.

Real roots
For large , the mean density of real roots near  is asymptotically

 
if 
and
 

It follows that the expected number of real roots is, using big  notation
 

In other words, the expected number of real roots of a random polynomial of high degree is lower than the natural logarithm of the degree.

Kac, Erdős and others have shown that these results are insensitive to the distribution of the coefficients, if they are independent and have the same distribution with mean zero. However, if the variance of the th coefficient is equal to  the expected number of real roots is

Geometry of multiple roots 

A polynomial  can be written in the form of

with distinct roots  and corresponding multiplicities . A root  is a simple root if  or a multiple root if . Simple roots are Lipschitz continuous with respect to coefficients but multiple roots are not. In other words, simple roots have bounded sensitivities but multiple roots are infinitely sensitive if the coefficients are perturbed arbitrarily. As a result, most root-finding algorithms suffer substantial loss of accuracy on multiple roots in numerical computation.

In 1972, William Kahan proved that there is an inherent stability of multiple roots. Kahan discovered that polynomials with a particular set of multiplicities form what he called a pejorative manifold and proved that a multiple root is Lipschitz continuous if the perturbation maintains its multiplicity.

This geometric property of multiple roots is crucial in numerical computation of multiple roots.

See also
 
 
 
 Quadratic function#Upper bound on the magnitude of the roots

Notes

References
 
 .

External links
The beauty of the roots, a visualization of the distribution of all roots of all polynomials with degree and integer coefficients in some range.

Polynomials